Mount Lawless is a rural locality in the North Burnett Region, Queensland, Australia.

Geography
The Burnett River forms most of the eastern boundary. It drains a basin covering  which is 1.9% of the total area of Queensland.

At the time the Burnett River Bridge was being built the site selected was "said to possess considerable scenic beauty. The exact spot is on a basalt crossing, on either side of which are large lagoons, in which fish and fowl abound."

History 
The area had started growing small crops, citrus orchards, grain and dairy cattle by 1905.  The Gayndah area is still known for these  primary industries, with irrigation, today.

Floods 
The Burnett River Bridge is also known as the Mt. Lawless railway bridge and is not to be confused with the Burnett Railway Bridge in Bundaberg.

This low-level railway bridge was built over the rapids in the Burnett River at Mount Lawless during 1906/1907.  The bridge engineer said at the time that it was "the longest bridge of its kind in Queensland ... and he felt sure that it would resist every pressure likely to be met with."  The bridge was flooded in 1911, 1918, 1921, 1928, 1929, 1934, 1949, 1950, 1954 and 1956.  It suffered major damage in the 1947 floods when nine spans of the  length of the bridge were washed away.  The damage occurred from 11 February 1947 and the bridge was repaired and restricted services resumed six weeks later.

The Queensland Government Irrigation and Water Supply Commission monitored a gauging station (No. 279) at the Mount Lawless railway bridge, one of several along the Burnett River and its tributaries.

The construction of the Jones Weir at Mundubbera, upstream from Mount Lawless, commenced in April 1947.  It was officially opened on Saturday 23 June 1951.  The weir is one of the oldest concrete weirs commissioned in Queensland. Construction slowed between December 1948 and March 1949 due to flooding.  Other upstream weirs followed.

The 2013 floods again removed the centre spans of the bridge, despite earlier flood protection measures.

Heritage listing 
The Official Register of Engineering Heritage Markers listed
 Degilbo-Mundubbera Railway Bridges in October 2016.  A total of 12 bridges that are situated on the Mungar Junction to Monto railway line, including the Burnett River Bridge, are recognized with one Engineering Heritage Marker representing the "best example of a collection of historic railway bridges in Australia".

References 

North Burnett Region
Localities in Queensland